is a Japanese table tennis player.

Career highlights
In May 2019, at the age of 14 years and 278 days, she won both the women's singles and doubles (with Miyu Nagasaki) at the Croatia Open. She was the youngest ever to win an international open tournament since the ITTF World Tour began in 1996.

In December 2019, she and Nagasaki captured the women's doubles title at the 2019 ITTF World Tour Grand Finals.

In January 2021, Kihara upset WR 11 Miu Hirano at the All Japan National Championships. In March 2021, Kihara advanced to the round of 16 in the WTT Contender event at World Table Tennis' inaugural event WTT Doha.

Achievements

ITTF and WTT finals

Singles

Women's doubles

Junior records
Singles
Asian Junior and Cadet Championships: 2nd (2016), 3rd (2018).

Doubles
World Junior Table Tennis Championships: 1st (2019), 2nd (2018), 3rd (2017)
Asian Junior and Cadet Championships: 1st (2019), 3rd (2017).

Mixed Doubles
World Junior Table Tennis Championships: 1st (2019)
Asian Junior and Cadet Championships: 3rd (2019).

Team
World Junior Table Tennis Championships: 2nd (2018, 2019)
Asian Junior and Cadet Championships: 2nd (2016, 2017), 3rd (2018, 2019).

References

2004 births
Japanese female table tennis players
Living people
Sportspeople from Hyōgo Prefecture
People from Akashi, Hyōgo
Kinoshita Abyell Kanagawa players
21st-century Japanese women
World Table Tennis Championships medalists